Carlota Joaquina, Princess of Brazil is a 1995 Brazilian historical comedy film directed and written by Carla Camurati. It stars Marieta Severo as Carlota Joaquina, Marco Nanini as Dom João VI and Marcos Palmeira as Dom Pedro I.

The film shows Carlota's efforts to conquer her enemies and become a queen. It tells a summarized tale, mixing history with popular folk traditions, from her childhood until her suicide.

Cast
 Marieta Severo as Carlota Joaquina of Spain
 Marco Nanini as John VI of Portugal
 Ludmila Dayer as Yolanda / young Carlota Joaquina
 Maria Fernanda as Maria I of Portugal
 Marcos Palmeira as Pedro I of Brazil
 Beth Goulart as Maria Teresa, Princess of Beira
 Antônio Abujamra as Count of Mata-Porcos
 Eliana Fonseca as Custódia
 Norton Nascimento as Fernando Leão
 Romeu Evaristo as Felisbindo
 Bel Kutner as Francisca
 Aldo Leite as Francisco José Rufino de Sousa Lobato, viscount of Vila Nova da Rainha 
 Chris Hieatt as Percy Smythe, 6th Viscount Strangford
 Maria Ceiça as Gertrudes

References

External links
 

1990s historical comedy films
1995 films
Brazilian historical comedy films
1990s English-language films
Films about royalty
Films set in the 19th century
Pedro I of Brazil
1990s Portuguese-language films
1990s Spanish-language films
1995 comedy films
Brazilian multilingual films
Cultural depictions of Portuguese women
Cultural depictions of Spanish women